The 1932–33 Michigan Wolverines men's basketball team represented the University of Michigan in intercollegiate basketball during the 1932–33 season. The team compiled a 10–8 record and 8–4 against Big Ten Conference opponents.  The team finished in a tie for third place in the Big Ten.

Franklin Cappon was in his second year as the team's head coach.  DeForest Eveland was the team captain and the team's leading scorer with 133 points in 18 games for an average of 7.4 points per game.

Scoring statistics

References

Michigan
Michigan Wolverines men's basketball seasons
Michigan Wolverines basketball
Michigan Wolverines basketball